twofour54 (stylised as twofour54) is a media and entertainment production company located in Abu Dhabi, United Arab Emirates that operates several production facilities, houses media companies and freelancers. It is also a media free zone. Many major Hollywood productions have done production work in twofour54's facilities. Their facilities also host the first CNN Academy.

Location and area
twofour54 is located in and named after the geographical coordinates of Abu Dhabi (24° N, 54° E), capital of the United Arab Emirates. The media free zone's main campus is located on the mainland (Yas Island). It also operates a 70,000 square meter backlot in Kizad and production studios in Mussafah, with plans to expand to build their Yas Creative Hub on Yas Island by the fourth quarter of 2021.

Background
The media free zone twofour54 was founded in 2008. It falls under Abu Dhabi Development Holding Company's remit. After twofour54's founding, former Universal executive Wayne Borg joined the company as chief commercial officer, a role in which he served until 2013. In 2020, Michael Garin was appointed CEO of twofour54.

The zone is home to a large number of international and local media companies, and offers infrastructure and support, such as end-to-end production services, government and travel services, 100% business ownership, and set-up and licensing.

twofour54 houses media companies in the audio, visual, and print industries, as well as news outlets and digital app creators.

As of 2020, more than 550 media companies and over 700 freelancers are based at twofour54, which has been involved in over 2,300 international major productions in Abu Dhabi. Notable films produced at twofour54 include Mission: Impossible – Fallout, 6 Underground and Bharat.

Past productions at twofour54
2012
The Bourne Legacy

2013
Deliver Us from Evil

2014
Baby
Bang Bang!
Star Wars: The Force Awakens
Fast & Furious 7
Al Ekhwa S1
Bold and Beautiful
Top Gear

2015
War Machine
GT Academy
The World Keeps Spinning

2016
Fan of Amoory
Dishoom
Haret El Sheikh
ET Arabia

2017
Tiger Zinda Hai
Love Without Borders

2018
Race 3
Mission Impossible: Fallout (Gemini)

2019
Saaho
Bharat
6 Underground
Al Asoof S1
Mirage
Al Asoof S2
Boxing Girls
Ghost

2020
Sonic the Hedgehog

2021
Bunty Aur Babli 2
Dune
Al Mirath

2022
Heropanti 2
Vikram Vedha

Notable companies at twofour54 

 CNN
 Edelman
 Euronews
 Fox
 Forbes
 M&C Saatchi
 The National (Abu Dhabi)
 Oracle
 Russia Today
 Sky News Arabia
 Sports 360
 Ubisoft

See also
 Dubai Media City
 Dubai Production City
 IMPZ 
 Creative City

References

Companies based in Abu Dhabi
Buildings and structures in Abu Dhabi
Mass media in Abu Dhabi
Free-trade zones of the United Arab Emirates
2008 establishments in the United Arab Emirates